Rammell is a surname. Notable people with the surname include:

Amanda Rammell (born 1985), beauty queen from Rexburg, Idaho
Andy Rammell (born 1967), former professional footballer
Bill Rammell (born 1959), British Labour Party politician, Minister of State for the Armed Forces at the Ministry of Defence
Rex Rammell, conservative politician from Idaho
Thomas Webster Rammell (died 1879), British engineer

See also
Rammell Mountain (10,121 feet (3,085 m), in the Teton Range in the U.S. state of Wyoming